Novae are cataclysmic nuclear explosions in white dwarf stars.

Novae may also refer to:

 Novae (fortress), Bulgaria
 Novae Group, insurance underwriting company
 "Novae", from drone metal band Sunn O's album Life Metal

See also